La Primavera District is one of fifteen districts of the province Bolognesi in Peru.

References

Districts of the Bolognesi Province
Districts of the Ancash Region